Stade de la Charrière is a multi-purpose stadium in La Chaux-de-Fonds, Switzerland.  It is currently used mostly for football matches and is the home ground of FC La Chaux-de-Fonds.  The stadium has 2,500 seats and 10,200 standing places.

See also 
List of football stadiums in Switzerland

External links
Photo of stadium at worldstadiums.com

Charriere
Charriere
Multi-purpose stadiums in Switzerland
FC La Chaux-de-Fonds